Abdolqader Zahedi (1907-2005) was a high-ranking Sunni religious figure and Iranian Kurdish politician. He received a clerical education and was not a war veteran. He was a member of Iran's Assembly of Experts from 1999 to 2005. He died in Saqqez on December 19, 2005.

References

Iranian Kurdish politicians
1907 births
2005 deaths
Members of the Assembly of Experts
People from Saghez